Equator Records is an independent record label established in 2006 in Montreal, Quebec, Canada.  The music label was founded by Matt Drouin and Fuzz de Grandpre. Equator  has released three albums, Islands' Return to the Sea, The Lovely Feathers' Hind Hind Legs and Teitur's second release, Stay Under the Stars. There is no connection between this label and the Equator Records of Nairobi, Kenya.

Artists
The Lovely Feathers
Islands
Teitur
Emily Haines
Metric
Michael Brook

See also
 List of record labels

External links
Equator Records official website
Equator Records' Myspace page
Islands official website
Islands' Myspace page

Record labels established in 2006
Canadian independent record labels
Indie rock record labels
Companies based in Montreal